Gradient in vector calculus is a vector field representing the maximum rate of increase of a scalar field or a multivariate function and the direction of this maximal rate.

Gradient may also refer to:
Gradient sro, a Czech aircraft manufacturer
 Image gradient, a gradual change or blending of color
 Color gradient, a range of position-dependent colors, usually used to fill a region
 Texture gradient, the distortion in size which closer objects have compared to objects farther away
 Spatial gradient, a gradient whose components are spatial derivatives
 Grade (slope), the inclination of a road or other geographic feature

Mathematics
 Gradient descent, a first-order iterative optimization algorithm for finding the minimum of a function
 Gradient theorem, theorem that a line integral through a gradient field can be evaluated by evaluating the original scalar field at the endpoints of the curve
 Gradient method, an algorithm to solve problems with search directions defined by the gradient of the function at the current point
 Conjugate gradient method, an algorithm for the numerical solution of particular systems of linear equations
 Nonlinear conjugate gradient method, generalizes the conjugate gradient method to nonlinear optimization
 Stochastic gradient descent, iterative method for optimizing a differentiable objective function
 Slope, a number that describes both the direction and the steepness of a line

See also
 
 
 Fade (disambiguation)
 Gradation (disambiguation)
 Grade (disambiguation)
 Rate of change (disambiguation)
 Transition (disambiguation)